Clive Tanner (January 7, 1934 – September 9, 2022) was a Canadian politician. He served in the Legislative Assembly of British Columbia from 1991 to 1996, as a British Columbia Liberal Party member for the constituency of Saanich North and the Islands.

Tanner previously lived in Yukon, where he was a member of the Yukon Territorial Council in the 1970s and served as Minister of Health. After the territory introduced partisan elections to the new Legislative Assembly of Yukon in 1977, Tanner ran as the Yukon Liberal Party candidate for Whitehorse Porter Creek West in the 1978 territorial election, but was not elected to the legislature.

He subsequently lived in Sidney, British Columbia, where he owned bookstores in Sidney and Victoria. He was a candidate in the BC Liberal Party's 1987 leadership race to succeed Art Lee, but he withdrew from the race in August after sustaining a leg injury.

Tanner died on September 9, 2022, at his home in Sidney, aged 88.

Electoral record

References

1934 births
2022 deaths
British Columbia Liberal Party MLAs
Members of the Yukon Territorial Council
Yukon Liberal Party politicians
English emigrants to Canada
People from Edmonton, London
Politicians from London